Cheshire Academy is a selective, co-educational college preparatory school located in Cheshire, Connecticut, United States. Founded in 1794 as the Episcopal Academy of Connecticut, it is currently the eleventh oldest boarding school in the United States. In 1917, the school was renamed The Roxbury School, and trained young men exclusively for the purpose of attending nearby Yale University. Later known as Cheshire Academy, the school was the first private academic institution to accept international students dating back to the 1850s, and it  is currently the only independent school to offer the International Baccalaureate Diploma Programme in the state of Connecticut.

The Academy currently enrolls 344 students from approximately 31 countries and 19 states in grades 9 through 12 plus a postgraduate year.

Campus
The campus includes five residential dormitories and facilities including the John J. White '38 Science & Technology Center and the Humanities Building. All areas of campus are equipped with wireless access and a fiber optic network with 30 mb access to the internet. In the fall of 2011, Cheshire Academy saw the dedication of the new Simosa track and field. Over the summer before the 2022-2023 school year, Cheshire Academy constructed new tennis courts and playing fields on their campus. At the same time, Cheshire Academy had the Simosa track and field updated.

History
The town of Cheshire, established in 1780, was originally known for its lighting industry, copper mining, and agricultural productivity. Samuel Seabury, the first Episcopal Bishop of Connecticut, established the Episcopal Academy in 1794, which would later endure several incarnations as The Cheshire School (in the early 1900s), The Roxbury School in 1917, and finally, Cheshire Academy in 1937.

Under the first headmaster, Rev. John Bowden, the school became renowned not only for training young men for the clergy, but also for educating students in the fields of English, Latin and Greek, philosophy, mathematics, and the sciences taught by leading colleges in the country at the time. Erected in 1796, Bowden Hall, the oldest schoolhouse still in continuous use in the state of Connecticut and tenth oldest schoolhouse in the United States, became an all-Cheshire community project, with funds to build the school donated by both churches and local proprietors.

In 1806, Dr. Tillotson Bronson was elected as headmaster. During his twenty-year term at the school, Bronson deemed that young women would be admitted to this once all-male institution, a rare allowance for women at the time. For this reason, many young women were sent to attend the school from distant townships in order to take advantage of such a unique educational opportunity.

Another liberal tenet of the school at this time, as drafted in the school's constitution, was that students were allowed the freedom to practice the religion of their family's choice, regardless of the school's Episcopal affiliation. As stated in the ninth article of the constitution of the Episcopal Academy, "No Bye Laws of the Academy shall compel the Students to attend Public worship, but at such place or places as their respective Parents or Guardians shall direct."

In 1917 the school was purchased by the Roxbury Training Center, and the institution was no longer open to both men and women. The Roxbury School operated with the sole purpose of training young men to enter Yale University. An existing military aspect of the school was abolished, and the school focused now on rigorous academic preparation.

Under long-standing headmaster Arthur Sheriff, the school became Cheshire Academy in 1937. It was not until 1969 that the school returned to its co-ed beginnings, allowing both young men and women to attend classes together.

Recent awards and achievements
 High School Mathematical Modeling Contest - In 2007-08, Cheshire Academy entered a team in the Consortium for Mathematics and its Applications annual math modeling contest. The CA team's 60-page model was judged to be in the top 4 out of the 270 teams competing and they were awarded the designation of National Outstanding.
 Software award - In 2008, five students were awarded Ars Technica's Best Indie Software Award after exhibiting in the Macworld expo.
NEPSAC Bowl Championship - In 2011, the Cheshire Academy boys varsity football team finished off an undefeated season, taking both the Colonial League and NEPSAC championship titles.

Signature programs
Roxbury Academic Support Program - An optional, fee-based program for students in need of additional academic assistance with a trained member of the faculty.

International Baccalaureate Diploma Programme - Cheshire Academy began to offer the International Baccalaureate Diploma Programme during the 2011-2012 academic year.

Arts Major Program - Advanced art students may take a year-long art major class. The class is designed to develop an artist’s passion in their chosen medium while providing a personal studio space to create their portfolios.

Scholarships
The Goizueta Foundation Scholars Fund, created by Roberto Goizueta '49, provides an annual scholarship for a student of Hispanic background.

The Town Scholar Program, established in 1937, provides a full, four-year scholarship to a resident of Cheshire entering the ninth grade.

Accreditation and memberships
The school is accredited by the Connecticut Association of Independent Schools, New England Association of Schools and Colleges, and The Association of Boarding Schools. Additionally it holds memberships in the National Association of Independent Schools,  the Secondary School Admission Test Board. and the IB Diploma Programme

Notable alumni
 Eric Bloom (1962), musician, Blue Öyster Cult.
 Chester Bowles (1919), 78th Connecticut Governor, Ambassador to India.
 Peter M. Brant (1964), CEO of White Birch Paper, 2007 Commencement speaker.
 Loring Buzzell (1944), music publisher and record label executive.
 J. Kenneth Campbell (b. 1947) film, stage, and television actor cast in over 80 roles
 Alberto Díaz, Jr. Rear Admiral, United States Navy.
 Geoffrey Cheney Ferris, Second Lieutenant, United States Army, awarded the Distinguished Service Cross during World War II.
 Andrew Hull Foote (1822), Civil War Admiral in the United States Navy.
 Fred Friendly (1915–1998), President of CBS News.
 Francisco Garcia, 2005 NBA top 25 draft pick; last played for Indios de San Francisco of the Liga Nacional de Baloncesto.
 Roberto Goizueta (1949) (1932–1997), former CEO of the Coca-Cola Company.
 Joseph W. Hasel, "Voice of the New York Giants".
 Mike Heller (b. 1982), musician, Fear Factory.
 Lambert Hitchcock (1795–1852), furniture maker.
 Robert A. Hurley (1895-1968), governor of Connecticut.
 John Frederick Kensett (1816–1872), artist.
 Rockwell Kent (1882–1971), artist.
 Talib Kweli (b. 1975), rapper.
 Norm Larsen (1923–1970), inventor of WD-40.
 Robert Ludlum (1945) (1927–2001), author, The Bourne Identity.
 Charles Le Moyne Mitchell (1844–1890)  U.S. Representative from Connecticut.
 J. P. Morgan (1837–1913), industrialist and financier.
 Pete Perreault, NFL lineman.
 Henry Shelton Sanford (1823–1891), United States Ambassador to Belgium and the founder of Sanford, Florida.
 Frank Shields, Tennis Hall of Fame, Wimbledon.
 James Van Der Beek (b. 1977), actor, Dawson's Creek.
 Gideon Welles (1802–1878), United States Secretary of the Navy from 1861 to 1869, after whom the school's dining hall is named.
 'Fighting Joe' Wheeler (1836–1906), Confederate General. 
 Sidney Wood, Tennis Hall of Fame, Wimbledon.

References

External links

 Cheshire Academy
 Harkness Tables

Boarding schools in Connecticut
Cheshire, Connecticut
Private high schools in Connecticut
Preparatory schools in Connecticut
Schools in New Haven County, Connecticut
Educational institutions established in 1794
1794 establishments in Connecticut
Private middle schools in Connecticut